Associazione Sportiva Dilettantistica Progreditur Marcianise (formerly Real Marcianise Calcio)  is an Italian football club, based in Marcianise, Campania. It currently plays in Serie D.

History

Foundation
The club was founded in 1951 as U.S. Marcianise.

 Real Marcianise 

 Lega Pro Prima Divisione 
In the Serie C2 2007-08 regular season, Real Marcianise Calcio, as renamed since 2004, finished third in Girone C, and qualified for the promotional playoffs.  The team defeated fourth-placed Vigor Lamezia in the semi-finals, 2–1 on aggregate, and then defeated fifth-placed Celano in the finals, 3–1 on aggregate to win promotion to, the now called, Lega Pro Prima Divisione for the 2008–09 season.

 The dissolution 
At the end of the 2009-10 Lega Pro Prima Divisione season the club was excluded from the championships for financial problems and was dissolved.

A.S.D. Marcianise
A new team A.S.D. Marcianise comes fifteenth in Group A of Promozione Campania and was dissolved.

 Progreditur Marcianise 
2011-2012
In 2011 was founded a new team A.S.D. Progreditur Marcianise formed by the merger between Vernall and Real Volturno'' di Alvignano, an Eccellenza team.
A.S.D. Progreditur Marcianise ended the season in mid-table (8th place).

2012-2013
In the 2012–2013 season the team won the championship of Eccellenza Campania winning promotion to Serie D.

Colors and badge 
The team's colors are yellow, red and green.

Defunct football clubs in Italy
Football clubs in Campania
Association football clubs established in 1951
Serie C clubs
1951 establishments in Italy